Feardomhnach of Tuam, died 777.

Feardomhnach may have been the successor of Nuada ua Bolcain as Abbot of Tuam, though he is not explicitly listed as such. Nothing else seems to be known of him. Because the abbatical succession at Tuam is only partly preserved, the next known abbot was listed over one hundred years later. 

Events in Ireland and Europe in the year of Feardomhnach's death included:

 Charlemagne defeats the Saxons led by Widukind.
 The battle of Cuirreach between the Uí Failghe and Laigin.
 Artghal, son of Cathal, King of Connaught, took the pilgrim's staff, and went to Hi (Iona) on his pilgrimage.

References

 Annals of Ulster at CELT: Corpus of Electronic Texts at University College Cork
 Annals of Tigernach at CELT: Corpus of Electronic Texts at University College Cork
Revised edition of McCarthy's synchronisms at Trinity College Dublin.
 Byrne, Francis John (2001), Irish Kings and High-Kings, Dublin: Four Courts Press, 
 Lysaght, Eamonn (1978), The Surnames of Ireland. , pp.233-34.

People from County Galway
8th-century Irish priests
777 deaths
Year of birth unknown